The 2012–13 Iranian Futsal 1st Division will be divided into two phases.

The league will also be composed of 16 teams divided into two divisions of 8 teams each, whose teams will be divided geographically. Teams will play only other teams in their own division, once at home and once away for a total of 14 matches each.

Teams

Play Off 
After the Maku Javan withdrew from league, Football Association decided to hold a playoff game between the two teams that won 3rd place in their group in the 2012 2nd Division.

 (P) Eisatis Yazd Promoted to the 1st Division.

Group A

Group B

League standings

Group A

Group B

Results table

Group A

Group B

Clubs season-progress

Play Off 

Winner Promoted to the Super League.

First leg

Return leg

Winner Promoted to the Super League.

First leg

Return leg

See also 
 2012–13 Futsal Super League
 2013 Iran Futsal's 2nd Division
 2012–13 Persian Gulf Cup
 2012–13 Azadegan League
 2012–13 Iran Football's 2nd Division
 2012–13 Iran Football's 3rd Division
 2012–13 Hazfi Cup
 Iranian Super Cup

References

External links 
  I.R. Iran Football Federation

Iran Futsal's 1st Division seasons
2012–13 in Iranian futsal leagues